Two Tickets for a Daytime Picture Show is a 1966 Soviet crime film directed by Gerbert Rappaport.

Plot 
The film tells about the Komsomol member Alyoshin, who goes to work in Department for Combating Theft of Socialist Property. Once in the workplace, he realizes that this is not his job and submits a report on dismissal. The boss, in turn, sets him a condition: Aleshin will be able to leave work, but only after completing one task. There were found two tickets from criminals to the cinema for the same place, but on different days. Alyoshin must figure it out...

Cast 
 Aleksandr Zbruyev as Alyoshin
 Zemfira Tsakhilova as Tonya
 Igor Gorbachyov as Nikolayev
 Pyotr Gorin as Shondysh
 Aleksey Kozhevnikov as Andreyev
 Nikita Podgorny as Lebedyansky
 Valentina Sperantova as Mother of Lebedyansky
 Bruno Frejndlikh as Blinov
 Larisa Barabanova as 'Thumbtack'

References

External links 
 

1966 films
1960s Russian-language films
Soviet crime films
1966 crime films